George Katsutoshi Nakashima ( Nakashima Katsutoshi, May 24, 1905 – June 15, 1990) was an American woodworker, architect, and furniture maker who was one of the leading innovators of 20th century furniture design and a father of the American craft movement. In 1983, he accepted the Order of the Sacred Treasure, an honor bestowed by the Emperor of Japan and the Japanese government.

Early life

Nakashima was born in 1905 in Spokane, Washington, to Katsuharu and Suzu Nakashima. He enrolled in the University of Washington program in architecture, graduating with a Bachelor of Architecture (B.Arch) in 1929.  In 1931, after earning a master's degree in architecture from M.I.T., Nakashima sold his car and purchased a round-the-world tramp steamship ticket. He spent a year in France working odd jobs to fund an artist's lifestyle. In Paris he was introduced to Bauhaus architect Le Corbusier, the two bonding over their views on the architect’s moral obligation to society and the practice as a spiritual activity. He then went on to North Africa and eventually to Japan. While in Japan, Nakashima went to work for Antonin Raymond, an American architect who had collaborated with Frank Lloyd Wright on the Imperial Hotel. While working for Raymond, Nakashima toured Japan extensively, studying the subtleties of Japanese architecture and design. During this period he met Marion Okajima, who would become his wife. While working for Raymond, Nakashima worked as the project architect for the Golconde Dormitory in Puducherry, India, supervising construction from 1937 to 1939 and immersing himself in the spiritual teachings of the Aurobindo sect. In 1964, Gira Sarabhai, invited Nakashima to Ahmedabad.  He spent three weeks in NID's wood workshop, designing chairs, benches, tables, ottomans, lounges, daybeds, shelves and mirror frames. They were kept in production in limited numbers at the institute by referring to the detailed drawings and instructions left by Nakashima, until about 1975, when Sarabhai stepped down.

Woodworking 

In 1937, Raymond's company was commissioned to build a dormitory at an ashram in Puducherry, India for which Nakashima was the primary construction consultant. It was here that Nakashima made his first furniture.

In 1940, Nakashima returned to America and began to make furniture and teach woodworking in Seattle. He was interned during the Second World War, like others of Japanese ancestry, being sent to Camp Minidoka in Hunt, Idaho, in March 1942. At the camp he met Gentaro (sometimes spelled Gentauro) Hikogawa, a man trained in traditional Japanese carpentry. Under his tutelage, Nakashima learned to master traditional Japanese hand tools and joinery techniques. Perhaps more significant, he began to approach woodworking with discipline and patience, striving for perfection in every stage of construction.

Nakashima's signature woodworking design was his large-scale tables made of large wood slabs with smooth tops but unfinished natural edges, consisting of multiple slabs connected with butterfly joints.

Nakashima, along with the Danish furniture maker Tage Frid, Swedish James Krenov, and Americans Wharton Esherick and Art Carpenter, are considered to be the among the “first generation” of Studio Furniture makers and are cited as highly influential to the field of contemporary woodworking.

New Hope inspiration
In 1943, Antonin Raymond successfully sponsored Nakashima's release from the camp and invited him to his farm to work as a chicken farmer in New Hope, Pennsylvania. In his studio and workshop at New Hope, Nakashima explored the organic expressiveness of wood and choosing boards with knots and burls and figured grain. He designed furniture lines for Knoll, including the Straight Back Chair (which is still in production), and Widdicomb-Mueller as he continued his private commissions. The studio grew incrementally until Nelson Rockefeller commissioned 200 pieces for his house in Pocantico Hills, New York, in 1973.

Nakashima has named the inspiration in his work to include the Japanese tea ceremony, American Shaker furniture, and the Zen Buddhist ideals of beauty. Nakashima self-identified as a “Hindu Catholic Shaker Japanese American”

Drawing on Japanese designs and shop practices, as well as on American and International Modern styles, Nakashima created a body of work that would make his name synonymous with the best of 20th century American Art furniture.

Legacy

Nakashima's home, studio, and workshop near New Hope, Pennsylvania, was listed on the U.S. National Register of Historic Places in August 2008; six years later the property was also designated a National Historic Landmark. In June 2015, the site received a "Keeping It Modern" grant from the Getty Foundation to create a solid conservation plan as a model approach for the preservation of historic properties. One of Nakashima's workshops, located in Takamatsu City, Japan, currently houses a museum and gallery of his works. The Nakashima Foundation for Peace, currently housed in the Minguren Museum in New Hope, had its beginnings in 1984.  In 1984, George Nakashima had the opportunity to purchase the largest and finest walnut log he had ever seen and sought to use the immense planks to their fullest potential. He dreamed then that if Altars for Peace were made for each continent of the world, as centers for meditation, prayer, and activities for peace, the world would be a better place. Over the past decade, his furniture has become ultra-collectible and his legacy of what became known as the "free-edge" aesthetic influential. Today the Nakashima business makes standard wooden furniture and continues to create more peace altars, soon to complete Nakashima's legacy. To do so the company has procured yet another extremely valuable walnut log that almost matches the size and magnificence of the original.

Nakashima's daughter, Mira Nakashima, took over the company from her father after he died in 1990. Mira, who has worked for the family business since 1970, currently produces his iconic designs as well as her own.

See also

Widdicomb Furniture Company, for which Nakashima designed the "Origin Group" collection.
National Institute of Design
Gira Sarabhai

References

 Nakashima, Mira. Nature, Form and Spirit: The Life and Legacy of George Nakashima. New York: Harry N. Abrams, 2003.

External links

 George Nakashima's Official Website
 Interview with George Nakashima in Life magazine
 Auction results and statistics from Nakashima
 US-based biggest collector The Exchange Int George Nakashima's A Sacred Relationship with Trees

1905 births
1990 deaths
American woodworkers
American furniture makers
American furniture designers
Japanese-American internees
Artists from Spokane, Washington
University of Washington College of Built Environments alumni
MIT School of Architecture and Planning alumni
20th-century American architects
American artists of Japanese descent
Recipients of the Order of the Sacred Treasure